Langelurillus kenyaensis is a jumping spider species in the genus Langelurillus that lives in Kenya. The female was first identified in 2016; the male has yet to be described.

References

Endemic fauna of Kenya
Fauna of Kenya
Salticidae
Spiders described in 2016
Spiders of Africa
Taxa named by Wanda Wesołowska